Cuba Solidarity Campaign is a British organisation that campaigns against the US embargo of Cuba, for an end to the US occupation of Cuban land at Guantanamo Bay, and to defend the Cuban people's right to be free from foreign intervention.

Activities
The Campaign operates travel tours to Cuba.

Supporters
Jeremy Corbyn, Labour MP for Islington North and Leader of the Labour Party from 2015–2020, is a long-time supporter of the Cuba Solidarity Campaign. In July 2016, in the midst of a leadership challenge by Angela Eagle, and on the day that Theresa May was appointed leader of the Conservative Party, Corbyn addressed the Cuba Solidarity Campaign. He was criticised by those who "pointed out the Cuban regime's record on human rights was poor and included imprisoning trade unionists." Following the death of Cuban leader Fidel Castro in November 2016, Corbyn said "Fidel Castro's death marks the passing of a huge figure of modern history, national independence and 20th century socialism."

Other supporters include:
Richard Burgon, Labour MP for Leeds East (2015–)
Grahame Morris, Labour MP for Easington (2010–)
Paul Maskey, Sinn Féin MP for Belfast West (2011–)
Father Geoff Bottoms, Catholic Priest
Maxine Peake, Actor 
Andy de la Tour, actor
Chris Williamson, Labour MP for Derby North (2010-15, 2017-19)
Cathy Jamieson, Labour MP for Kilmarnock and Loudoun (2010–15)
Ken Livingstone, Former Labour mayor of London

Affiliates
The following trade unions are affiliated to the campaign:
Associated Society of Locomotive Engineers and Firemen
Derby Trades Union Council
Eastbourne Trades Union Council
Broadcasting, Entertainment, Cinematograph and Theatre Union
Chartered Society of Physiotherapy
Communication Workers Union
Fire Brigades Union
GMB Union
Musicians Union
NAPO
NASUWT
National Union of Journalists
National Union of Mineworkers
National Union of Teachers
Public and Commercial Services Union
Prison Officers Association
RMT
Transport Salaried Staffs' Association
Trades Union Congress
Union of Construction, Allied Trades and Technicians
University and College Union
UNISON
Unite the Union
Union of Shop, Distributive and Allied Workers

See also
Norwegian Cuba Association

References

Aftermath of the Cuban Revolution
Political organisations based in London
Cuba–United Kingdom relations
Political advocacy groups in the United Kingdom
Cuba solidarity groups